Hérisson is a town in the Allier department in central France.

Population

Notable people
 Henri Harpignies (28 June 1819 – 28 August 1916), 19th century painter of the Barbizon school who made many pictures of Hérisson and the surroundings.
 Louis Bignon (26 June 1816 - 18 May 1906), restaurateur, who made the Café Riche the most fashionable in Paris.
 Olivier Perrier (born 15 September 1940), actor, codirector of the "Théâtre des Fédérés".

Gallery

See also
Communes of the Allier department

References

Communes of Allier
Bituriges Cubi
Allier communes articles needing translation from French Wikipedia